Stenløse station is a station on the Frederikssund radial of the S-train network in around Copenhagen, Denmark. It is located centrally in the town of Stenløse.

Services

See also
 List of railway stations in Denmark

References

S-train (Copenhagen) stations
Railway stations opened in 1989
Railway stations in Denmark opened in the 20th century